The Crossroads of the West Council is a local council of the Boy Scouts of America that serves the Scouts in all of Utah, Bear Lake and Franklin counties in southeastern Idaho, and Uinta, Sweetwater, Sublette, and a portion of Lincoln counties in southwestern Wyoming.

Description
The council was created in April 2020 by consolidating the former Great Salt Lake, Trapper Trails, and Utah National Parks Councils.  The Council number is #590, as recognized by National designation. The Council name and first designed patch ideas came from the Utah State quarter issued in 2007.

The council headquarters are in Ogden, Utah, and maintains a satellite office in Orem, Utah.

The Council website is: www.utahscouts.org.

Crossroads of the West Council publishes an annual report, and can be accessed at: www.utahscouts.org/annualreport.

Organization
The Crossroads of the West Council serves 9 districts.

A Scouting district is a geographical area of the local BSA council, determined by the council executive board. District leaders mobilize resources to ensure the growth and success of units within the district's territory. All districts are responsible for carrying out four standard functions: membership, finance, program, and unit service.

 Old Ephraim District – Idaho: Bear Lake and Franklin counties; Utah: Box Elder, Cache, and Rich counties
 Weber Rapids District – Morgan and Weber counties
 Jim Bridger District – Wyoming: southern Lincoln, Sweetwater, Sublette, and Uinta counties; Utah: Daggett County
 Thurston Peak District – Davis County
 Oquirrh Mountain District – West Salt Lake County (west of I-15 except Draper and Sandy) and Tooele County
 Wasatch Peaks District  – East Salt Lake County (east of I-15 including Draper and Sandy) and Summit County
 Timpanogos District – North Utah County (Orem and all cities north); Duchesne, Uintah, and Wasatch counties
 Silver Sage District – South Utah (Provo and all cities south); Carbon, Emery, Grand, Juab, and San Juan (except south of the San Juan River) counties
 Spanish Trails District – Beaver, Garfield, Iron, Kane, Millard, Piute, Sanpete, Sevier, Washington, and Wayne counties in Utah, the Arizona Strip, Lincoln County in Nevada

Camps
The council owns/operates the following camps:

 Camp Bartlett (Bear Lake County), program currently includes 3 and 4-day youth camps. Activity stations include: swimming, canoes, kayaks, paddle boards, rifle shooting, archery & knife throwing, climbing wall, bouldering center and slack lines.
 Bear Lake Aquatics Base (Rich County, west shore of Bear Lake), campsite rentals, and hosts BSA youth & adult trainings and the annual Bike the Bear bike ride.
 Camp Browning (Weber County, northeast of Causey Reservoir), program currently includes 3 and 4-day youth camps. Activity stations include: archery and knife throwing, ropes course (low & high), canoeing on Causey Reservoir, rappelling and rock climbing.
 Camp Eagle Mountain (Utah County, south Cedar Fort)
 Camp Fife (Box Elder County, Bear River, east of Fielding), program currently includes day camps for Cub Scouts, Webelos Scouts and primary youth. Program highlights include a BMX bike course, BB guns, archery and a climbing wall.
 Hinckley Scout Reservation (Summit County)
 Camp Hunt (Rich County, west shore of Bear Lake), program currently includes week-long Scouts BSA camp and 3 and 4-day youth camps.  Activity stations include: swimming, paddle boards, kayaks, canoes, rowboats and sailboats.
 James Bacon Memorial Park (Uintah County), facility for BSA youth & adult trainings.
 Camp Kiesel (Weber County, northeast of Causey Reservoir), program currently includes day camps for Cub Scouts, Webelos Scouts and primary youth. Program highlights include a nature trail, BB guns, archery and rowboats on the camp's pond.
 Camp Loll (Teton County, west of Lake of the Woods), sandwiched between Grand Teton and Yellowstone National Parks, Camp Loll offers week-long Scouts BSA camps that include the following programs areas: nature, handicraft, pioneering, shooting, archery and aquatics activities. The camp offers guided treks in to Yellowstone National Park, Grand Teton National Park and the Jedediah Smith Wilderness.
 Camp Maple Dell (Utah County, in Payson Canyon), program currently includes day camps for Cub Scouts, Webelos Scouts and primary youth. Program highlights include a nature trail, BB guns, archery and rowboats on the camp's pond. The camp also hosts BYU's Especially for Youth (EFY) program later in the summer. Throughout the year, the council utilizes the camp for district events, council trainings and events.
 Moab Base Camp (Grand County), the camp hosts BYU's Especially for Youth (EFY) program.
 Camp New Fork (Sublette County)
 Ogden Ropes Course (Weber County), this facility is available for groups to use in the summer (June–September) to development of trust, communication, self-esteem, leadership, problem-solving, decision-making and teamwork.
 Quail Creek Scout Camp (Washington County, south of Quail Creek Reservoir), facility for BSA youth & adult trainings.
 Camp Steiner (Duchesne County)
 Teton High Adventure Base (Teton County, Hoback Junction), utilized by Teton Whitewater to offer guided whitewater trips on the Snake River.
 Camp Thunder Ridge (Iron County), program currently includes week-long Scouts BSA camp and 3 and 4-day youth camps.  Activity stations include: rifle shooting, archery, ropes course, group games and hiking at the nearby Cedar Breaks National Monument and a short drive to Bryce Canyon National Park.
 Camp Tifie (Sanpete County, San Pitch Mountains, southeast of Mount Pleasant), program currently includes week-long Scouts BSA camp and 3 and 4-day youth camps.  Activity stations include: swimming at the pool, rifle shooting, archery, high and low ropes course and group games.
 Camp Tracy (Salt Lake County, Millcreek Canyon), program currently includes day camps for Cub Scouts, Webelos Scouts and primary youth. Program highlights include a nature trail, BB guns, archery and rowboats on the camp's pond. Throughout the year, the council utilizes the camp for district events, council trainings and events. The camp also features a ropes course for groups to use in the summer (June–September) to development of trust, communication, self-esteem, leadership, problem-solving, decision-making and teamwork.

Ammatdiio Lodge
The Crossroads of the West Council is serviced by Ammatdiio Lodge (#590), Order of the Arrow.   In October 2020, the Ammatdiio Lodge was chartered, merging the Awaxaawe Awachia (#535), El Ku Ta (#520), and Tu-Cubin-Noonie (#508) Lodges.

The Lodge name, Ammatdiio, translates to mean “Where Paths Cross.”  The Lodge uses the council number #590 for collecting destination and has nine chapters, one formed under each district and given that name (i.e.: Jim Bridger Chapter).  "Typically, there is one chapter created in each district of the council. Each chapter would then have its own officers and advisers, the officers being elected by the youth OA members within the chapter, and the advisers being appointed by the Scout executive often with the consultation of the lodge adviser and district executive(s)."

The animal totem of the Ammatdiio Lodge is the Bobcat.

The Order of the Arrow is the National Honor Society of the Boy Scouts of America and is composed of Scouts and Scouters who best exemplify the Scout Oath and Law in their everyday lives, and meet the camping and election requirements set forth by the OA.

See also

 Scouting in Utah
 Scouting in Idaho
 Scouting in Wyoming

References

External links

 
 Scout Camps USA

Local councils of the Boy Scouts of America
Youth organizations based in Utah
Western Region (Boy Scouts of America)
2020 establishments in Utah